Methodist Church Cemetery is a historic Methodist cemetery and national historic district located at Lincolnton, Lincoln County, North Carolina. It was established about 1828, and contains the marked graves of some 275 members of the Methodist church, and/or citizens of Lincolnton.  The gravestones include notable examples of 19th and early-20th century funerary art. The property was also the site of Lincolnton's Methodist churches and religious worship from about 1822 until 1920.

It was listed on the National Register of Historic Places in 1994.

References

External links
 

Cemeteries on the National Register of Historic Places in North Carolina
Historic districts on the National Register of Historic Places in North Carolina
1828 establishments in North Carolina
Buildings and structures in Lincoln County, North Carolina
National Register of Historic Places in Lincoln County, North Carolina